OWN may also refer to:
Old West Norse, a North Germanic language
Once Was Not (2005), an album by Cryptopsy
One Warrior Nation, what The Ultimate Warrior calls his fans
Oprah Winfrey Network, a U.S.-based cable and satellite television channel
Oprah Winfrey Network (Canadian TV channel), a Canadian cable and satellite television channel

See also
Ownership
Owned, a slang word